Berta Karlik (24 January 1904 – 4 February 1990) was an Austrian physicist. She worked for the University of Vienna, eventually becoming the first female professor at the institution. While working with Ernst Foyn she published a paper on the radioactivity of seawater.  She discovered that the chemical element 85 astatine is a product of the natural decay processes. The element was first synthesized in 1940 by Dale R. Corson, K. R. MacKenzie, and Emilio Segrè, after several scientists in vain searched for it in radioactive minerals.

Biography

Early life and education 
Berta Karlik was born in Vienna to an upper-class family and was home-taught for her elementary education. While being taught at home she learned to play the piano as well as speak and write French, Dutch and English. From 1919 to 1923, she attended the Reform-Realgymnasium and upon graduating in 1923 she was accepted as a regular student to the Philosophical Faculty at the University of Vienna until 1928 when she received her Ph.D.

While enrolled as a student at the university Karlik became an essential member of Hans Pettersson's research group at the Radium Institute with her specialty being the scintillation counter. Karlik also attended a fellowship from the International Federation of University Women which required her to travel while working for the Radium Institute.

After receiving her degree in physics, Karlik accepted a teaching position at the Realgymnasium in Vienna, where she was a former pupil.

Entering the Field 
In 1930 Karlik found a job at a laboratory run by William Henry Bragg in London. Here she worked on crystallography and used X-rays to study the structure of crystals. Karlik's knowledge of radiophysics attracted the attention of noted crystallographers Ellie Knaggs and Helen Gilchrist. The same year that she formed a group with these two women is the same year she first visits Marie Curie's lab in Paris which signaled the start of her long correspondence with various other female physicists.

While Karlik occasionally sent letters to Marie Curie she kept regular correspondence with other notable physicists such as Ellen Gleditsch and Eva Resmtedt, two of the Curie researchers, as well as Lise Meitner, with whom Karlik was quite close during her life. Throughout her life she would meet with Meitner who worked with the team responsible for discovering nuclear fission.

Research 
After studying in Paris and London she started working at the Institut für Radiumforschung (Institute for Radium Research) in Vienna in 1931. From 1937 she was allowed to give lectures, and slowly advanced in the hierarchy of the institute.

Simultaneously Karlik joined a group on seawater research headed by the Swedish physicist Hans Pettersson. Mixing knowledge of oceanography and radioactivity, Karlik helped to bring up concerns about the biological issue of uranium contamination of seawater.

During the Second World War she made her most important discovery, that the element with the atomic number 85, Astatine, was a product of natural decay. Astatine's main use is in radiotherapy to kill cancer cells. Due to this discovery Karlik was awarded the Haitinger Prize for Chemistry from the Austrian Academy of Sciences in 1947.

She became provisional director of the institute in 1945 and official director in 1947 upon discovering the existence of astatine. Berta Karlik was the first woman to be full professor ("ordentliche Professur") at the University of Vienna in 1956. She retired in 1973, but worked at the institute until her death in 1990.

Publications 
 "An Alpha-Radiation Ascribed to Element 85," S.B.Akad. Wiss. Wien, 152:Abt. IIa (Nos. 6–10) 103-110(1943), with T. Bernert.
 "Element 85 in the Natural Disintegration Series," Z. Phys., 123: (Nos. 1–2) 51-72 (1944), with T. Bernert.
 "Uranium Content of Seawater," Akad. Wiss. Wien, Ber, 144:2a (Nos.5-6) 217-225 (1935), with F. Hernegger.

See also
 Timeline of women in science
 Women in physics

Notes

References 

 Tsoneva-Mathewson, S., M. F. Rayner-Canham, G. F. Rayner-Canham, A Devotion to Their Science: Pioneer Women of Radioactivity, (Eds. Rayner-Canham), McGill-Queen.s University Press (1997)

Sources 
 Archive, Austrian Academy of Sciences, Vienna, Archivbehelf: Institut fur Radiumforschung, XIII. Berta Karlik, Karton 43, Fiche 629

20th-century Austrian physicists
1904 births
1990 deaths
Austrian women physicists
University of Vienna alumni
20th-century women scientists